{{safesubst:#invoke:RfD|||month = March
|day = 18
|year = 2023
|time = 07:07
|timestamp = 20230318070744

|content=
REDIRECT 2022–2023 abortion protests

}}